Ruslan Isidorovich Khubetsov (born 8 March 1973) is a former Russian football player.

His son David Khubetsov is now a professional goalkeeper as well.

References

1973 births
Living people
Soviet footballers
FC Elista players
Russian footballers
FC Spartak Vladikavkaz players
Russian Premier League players
Association football goalkeepers
FC Spartak-UGP Anapa players
FC Dynamo Kirov players